Vincent Anthony Scelsa (born December 12, 1947, in Bayonne, New Jersey) is an American broadcaster who was at "the forefront of the FM radio revolution" as the host of several freeform radio programs, the best-known titled Idiot's Delight. His eclectic mix of music, reviews, and lengthy interviews with authors and artists has established Scelsa as a fixture in late night New York City radio for decades.

Early life
He attended Upsala College in East Orange, New Jersey, where he spent his early broadcasting years in several functions at the college's station, WFMU. He hosted his first show there in November 1967. Scelsa originally considered becoming a Jesuit priest before pursuing a career in radio.

Radio career

1970s–2000s: Commercial radio 
Scelsa went on to work in commercial radio first on Long Island in the early 1970s at WLIR and at non-commercial WBAI-FM in New York City. He became road manager for singer-songwriter Townes Van Zandt and also worked for Poppy Records. On February 14, 1971, while he was music director and a DJ at WABC-FM, the station changed its call letters to WPLJ, an acronym for and homage to the song, performed by The Four Deuces in 1955 and the Mothers of Invention in 1970, called "White Port and Lemon Juice."

When WPLJ restricted the air personalities' ability to pick their own music to play, Scelsa moved to WNEW-FM 102.7 where he hosted late nights and evenings from 1973 through 1982. In 1981 he was namechecked on The Ramones' "It's Not My Place (In the 9 to 5 World)" on the album Pleasant Dreams. Similarly, when WNEW instituted fixed playlists for all personalities in 1982, Scelsa moved on again. He surfaced briefly once again at WLIR before devoting the next two years to off-air endeavors. He joined then-new rock station WXRK-FM 92.3 K-Rock in 1985 and hosted a freeform program there through the end of 1995. His Sunday night show at K-Rock became known as "Idiot's Delight,"  and many fans of the show participated in the online e-mail group "Idiot's Delight Digest."

In January 1996, K-Rock changed its format from classic rock to alternative rock (except for Howard Stern in the morning, who remained all talk). Scelsa opted to leave the station rather than restrict his playlist to the newer rock and shortly thereafter returned to WNEW-FM where he continued hosting "Idiot's Delight". For a period of time at WNEW, Vin channeled his doubts regarding the station's commitment to his show by playing a different version of the standards chestnut "I'll Be Seeing You" each week. Yet Vin remained in place at WNEW through several programming formats until the end of 2000.

During the last years of this WNEW stint, "Idiot's Delight" usually did not have a fixed ending time. Rather, the show was officially scheduled to run from 8:00 pm Sunday nights through 2:00 am Monday mornings, but in actuality ended as late as 4:30 am, depending upon when Vin felt the show had reached an appropriate conclusion.  The final 'Idiots Delight' on WNEW was particularly memorable. It aired on December 31, 2000, and ended at around 3:30 am on January 1, 2001.

2000s–2010s: Return to public radio, and satellite
Scelsa announced that "Idiot's Delight" was moving to noncommercial WFUV/90.7 FM. He also briefly hosted an internet only radio show called "Live at Lunch" during 2000 and 2001 which he broadcast from his home or from a custom-built studio at J&R Music World. His WFUV program was one of the few to not be streamed on the internet initially, because Scelsa preferred to be free of the online regulations of the period which limited the programming of multiple tracks from an artist or album without special permission.

In addition to the Saturday night WFUV broadcasts, Scelsa began hosting two additional hours of "Idiot's Delight" live on both Wednesday and Thursday afternoons for Sirius/XM Satellite Radio's "The Loft," (initially called Sirius Disorder). The four weekly hours of Sirius/XM shows are repeated early Friday mornings and on Sunday nights.

On his March 28, 2015, WFUV show, Scelsa announced he would be retiring from radio. His last show on SiriusXM aired on April 30, 2015, and his final radio show aired on WFUV on May 2, 2015.

Other projects
Scelsa served as the music editor of Penthouse Magazine from 1988 to 1992 and was the co-creator of a musical series with the lengthy name In Their Own Words: A Bunch Of Songwriters Sittin' Around Singing at The Bottom Line in New York City. For several years in the mid-90s, Scelsa selected music for a Time-Life records music series called 'Grooves.' Many CDs in the series included a live performance from 'Idiots Delight,' and Scelsa wrote the liner notes.

Scelsa has also appeared on stage numerous times, most notably as Vladimir in the Luna Stage production of Waiting for Godot.

Personal life
In 2006 he underwent successful surgery for prostate cancer. On his WFUV show of September 16, 2006, he announced a schedule change which he attributed to his health problems. For a short time "Idiot's Delight" presented new programming only from 8 to 10 pm on Saturdays, with archived material (from both WFUV and his earlier programs) from 10 pm to midnight.

Scelsa married his wife Freddie in 1970. The two met in high school.

Scelsa has ended his radio programs since the late-70s WNEW-FM overnight shifts with the closing sound-clip from the movie "The Wizard of Oz", where Judy Garland in her role as Dorothy says "Oh Auntie Em, there's no place like home," and the orchestra breaks into the melody of "Over the Rainbow."

Honors

On December 13, 2007 (a few weeks after celebrating his 40th anniversary on New York radio, and the day after his 60th birthday) Vin was the recipient of the prestigious ASCAP Deems Taylor Radio Broadcast Award. Scelsa was praised for "outstanding coverage of music on his long-running show Idiot's Delight" (as heard on WFUV broadcast radio and Sirius/XM Satellite Radio). Songwriter Marilyn Bergman, President and chairman of the board of ASCAP stated in her presentation of the award, "Vin Scelsa, a mainstay of New York radio for four decades, is one of the last true free-form radio hosts... He is a champion of new and untested music and, with his devoted listening public, an important tastemaker."

In accepting the award, Vin thanked New York radio veterans Bob Fass (an early mentor and role model), Scott Muni (WNEW-FM air personality and program director) for trusting Vin with total freedom on a major commercial radio station) and air personality Alison Steele (who taught him about the painful struggle faced by women in broadcasting well into the 1970s).

Scelsa also acknowledged the many general managers and program directors who tended to ignore him and pass him along from one to the next, rather like an enigmatic "grandfather clause."  He tipped his hat to a mysterious "rabbi named Mel" – in thanks for whatever it is the rabbi does or doesn't do to protect him from the harsh realities of 21st Century radio. This tribute is thought to have been a reference to veteran Infinity Broadcasting/CBS/Viacom/Sirius-XM radio executive Mel Karmazin. He thanked his parents for being constant radio listeners and his wife.

References

External links
Vin Scelsa, Fare Thee Well
Idiot's Delight Message Board
Audio Archive of Idiot's Delight Shows (VINdication)
The Idiot's Delight Digest
Complete Archive of the Idiot's Delight Digest
The Idiot's Delight Digest Information Hub
Free-Form D.J. Loses Weekly Radio Show
VIN!dication – where new (old) shows are added every week

American people of Italian descent
Radio personalities from New York City
People from Bayonne, New Jersey
1947 births
Living people
American radio DJs
Upsala College alumni
WFUV people